The Holocaust Encyclopedia is an online encyclopedia, published by the United States Holocaust Memorial Museum, offering detailed information about The Holocaust and the events surrounding it.

The encyclopedia is organized by the following topics:

 The Third Reich
 The Holocaust
 Victims of the Nazi Era
 Rescue and Resistance
 After the Holocaust
 Additional Resources

It includes a number of articles and other resources:

 Articles (840)
 Identity cards of victims (600)
 Artifacts (140)
 Documents (35)
 Historical film footage (160)
 Oral histories (550)
 Maps (25)
 Music (11)
 Photographs (1300)

Holocaust Encyclopedia materials and other resources are available in multiple languages: Arabic, Greek, Spanish, French, Italian, Korean, Russian, Urdu, Farsi, Bahasa Indonesia, Portuguese, Turkish, Chinese

It includes a learning site for students. Organized by theme, the site uses text, photographs, maps, artifacts, and personal histories to provide an overview of the Holocaust.

External links 
 Official website in English

20th-century encyclopedias
21st-century encyclopedias
American online encyclopedias
Multilingual websites
United States Holocaust Memorial Museum